Thuit or Tuit may refer to:

Places in Eure, France
 Thuit-Hébert
 Le Thuit, Eure
 Le Thuit-Anger
 Le Thuit-de-l'Oison
 Le Thuit-Signol
 Le Thuit-Simer
 Port-Tuit, the medieval name of Vieux-Port

Other
 Tashkent University of Information Technologies (TUIT)
 Dolston Tuit (born 1986), West Indian cricketer
 Len Tuit (1911–1976), Australian road transport and tourism pioneer

See also 
 
 Risteárd de Tiúit (Richard (de) Tuite), an Irish lord of Hiberno-Norman descent
 Thwaite (placename element)